Starkie is a surname. Notable people with the surname include:

 Enid Starkie, Irish literary critic
 Martin Starkie (1922–2010), English actor, writer, and director
 Thomas Starkie, English lawyer and jurist
 Richard Starkie, British doctor
 Walter Starkie, Irish scholar, Hispanist, author, and musician

See also
 Starkey (disambiguation)